Katuru Narayana is an Indian rocket scientist and a former director of Satish Dhawan Space Centre, one of the two launch centres of the Indian Space Research Organisation. He held the post from 1999 to 2005 after which he served as the co-chairman of the Mission Readiness Review Committee for two Indian space programs, Polar Satellite Launch Vehicle and Geosynchronous Satellite Launch Vehicle. He is a recipient of an honorary doctorate from Sri Venkateswara University. The Government of India awarded him the fourth highest civilian honour of the Padma Shri, in 2002, for his contributions to science and engineering.

See also 
 Satish Dhawan Space Centre
 Polar Satellite Launch Vehicle
 Geosynchronous Satellite Launch Vehicle

References 

Recipients of the Padma Shri in science & engineering
Year of birth missing (living people)
Living people
Indian Space Research Organisation people
Indian aerospace engineers
Rocket scientists
Satish Dhawan Space Centre